Chernus is a surname. Notable people with the surname include: 

Ira Chernus (born 1946), American journalist, author, and professor
Michael Chernus (born 1977), American actor